Bishopstone railway station is on the western side of the town of Seaford, East Sussex, England.

Before this station opened the first Bishopstone station was  further west at Tide Mills.

Buildings and structures

The present station was designed by the architect James Robb Scott and opened on 26 September 1938, the same day that the original Bishopstone station at Tide Mills was first closed. The Art Deco design is said to be inspired by that of Arnos Grove tube station, which was designed by Charles Holden, and was intended to be the centrepiece of a proposed residential development that never took place due to the outbreak of the Second World War.

The main building of the station is symmetrical, with an octagonal central booking hall and two extended wings. One of these wings formerly contained the ticket office and parcels office, and the other contained a waiting room and toilets. As-built, the station had two side platforms in a cutting, accessed by stairs from a footbridge linking to the main station building.

In 1940 a pair of pillboxes was built on the roof of the main station building, flanking its octagonal tower. Despite the times, considerable effort was made to blend these into the original structure, and they are thus well camouflaged.

The last member of staff, station manager Una Shearing, was withdrawn in 1988. The old booking office and parcel office was restored in 2022 in phase 1 of a restoration project with the support of Friends of Bishopstone Station. This is now run by the Friends as The Old Parcel Room Community hub. The remaining station facilities will be restored in phase 2 of the project. The main access to the trains is still accessed via the octagonal booking hall, which is top lit by glass pavement lights supported by a concrete grid. The line was singled in 1975 and all trains now use the former up platform.

Bishopstone Station is a grade II listed building, which is on English Heritage's at-risk register.

Services

 the typical off-peak service pattern in trains per hour is:
 2 tph to 
 2 tph to Seaford

Incidents
On 3 July 1940 Luftwaffe fighter aircraft machine-gunned and bombed a train near Bishopstone Station. The train driver was killed and several passengers were wounded.

References

External links

Seaford, East Sussex
DfT Category F2 stations
Railway stations in East Sussex
Former Southern Railway (UK) stations
Railway stations in Great Britain opened in 1938
Railway stations served by Govia Thameslink Railway
James Robb Scott buildings